Diane Carr  is an artist known for her relief sculptures incorporating natural materials and forms.

Biography

Early life and education
Born in Eaton Rapids, Michigan, Carr received a B.A. (1967) from Michigan State University, and a M.F.A. (1976) from Wayne State University.

Career
Associated with the Cass Corridor artists working in Detroit in the 1960s through 1980s, her works in the 1970s-1980s are small scale reliefs, rectangular in format, and constructed of layers of organic materials. Later works (1990s onward) are notable for their increased size and curvilinear forms.
In 1977, she was a Guest Lecturer for Cranbrook Academy of Art in Bloomfield Hills, Michigan. The next year, Carr worked as a Painting Coordinator for Ox Bow Summer Workshop in Saugatuck, Michigan. The following year she was a Visiting Artist at Wesleyan University in Bloomington, Indiana.

Exhibitions

Public commissions, collections
 "Skystone", Outdoor Sculpture for the New Buffalo Welcome Center, MI
 "Sky Crystals", 4 Wall Sculptures for 15 ft. x 46 ft. wall, Karmanos Cancer Center in Detroit, MI.
 Detroit Institute of Arts, 2 Wall Sculptures, Detroit, MI
 Dennos Museum Center, 1 Wall Sculpture, Traverse City, MI
 Southwestern Michigan College, 1 Wall Sculpture, Dowagiac, MI

Awards
 1974-76 Graduate Professional Scholarship, Wayne State University, Detroit, MI
 1976 Mary Woodruff Award, Detroit Artist Market
 1985 Creative Artist Award, Michigan Council for the Arts
 1996 "North West Michigan Regional Artists", Dennos Museum Center, Traverse City, Michigan
 2006 "North West Michigan Regional Artists", Dennos Museum Center, Traverse City, Michigan

References 

3. http://dianecarrart.com/Artist.html

1946 births
Living people
20th-century American sculptors
20th-century American women artists
American women sculptors
Artists from Detroit
Michigan State University alumni
People from Eaton Rapids, Michigan
Wayne State University alumni
Sculptors from Michigan
21st-century American women artists